Casas Grandes Municipality is located in the northern Mexican state of Chihuahua. The municipal seat is the town of Casas Grandes, Chihuahua.

The pre-Columbian archaeological zone Casas Grandes and its central site, after which the municipality is named, is located within the municipality's territory. The site of Casas Grandes, alternatively known as Paquimé, is one of the most significant pre-Columbian cultural and archaeological sites in the region of northwestern Mexico and the southwestern United States known in some archaeological contexts as the Oasisamerica culture area.

Geography
The municipality of Casas Grandes is situated in the northwestern sector of Chihuahua state, the largest state of Mexico by area. Casas Grandes is bounded by the municipalities of Janos to the north, Galeana, Nuevo Casas Grandes and Madera, Chihuahua to the east, and Ignacio Zaragoza to the south. On its western flank Casas Grandes adjoins municipalities within the state of Sonora.

Demographics
As of 2010, the municipality had a total population of 10,587, up from 8,413 as of 2005.

As of 2010, the town of Casas Grandes had a population of 5,256. Other than the town of Casas Grandes, the municipality had 296 localities, the largest of which (with 2010 populations in parentheses) were: Juan Mata Ortíz (Pearson) (1,182) and Colonia Juárez (1,035), classified as rural.

Notes

References

 
 

Municipalities of Chihuahua (state)
1820 establishments in the Spanish Empire